Nicolás Andrés Freitas Silva (born 8 June 1987) is a Uruguayan footballer who plays for Boston River.

Personal life
Freitas' brother, Gonzalo, is also a footballer.

Honours
Internacional
Campeonato Gaúcho: 2015

References

External links

Peñarol 2016 se va armando: Nicolás Freitas ..., tenfield.com.uy, 9 January 2016

1987 births
Living people
Uruguayan footballers
Uruguayan expatriate footballers
Footballers from Montevideo
Peñarol players
C.A. Bella Vista players
Rosario Central footballers
Everton de Viña del Mar footballers
Montevideo Wanderers F.C. players
Sport Club Internacional players
FBC Melgar footballers
Sud América players
Boston River players
Chilean Primera División players
Campeonato Brasileiro Série A players
Uruguayan Primera División players
Primera Nacional players
Peruvian Primera División players
Association football midfielders
Uruguayan expatriate sportspeople in Chile
Uruguayan expatriate sportspeople in Argentina
Uruguayan expatriate sportspeople in Brazil
Uruguayan expatriate sportspeople in Peru
Expatriate footballers in Chile
Expatriate footballers in Argentina
Expatriate footballers in Brazil
Expatriate footballers in Peru